Beasy is a surname. Notable people with the surname include:

Callan Beasy (born 1982), Australian rules footballer
Doug Beasy (1930–2013), Australian rules footballer
Maurie Beasy (1896–1979), Australian rules footballer

See also
Betsy